The Journal of Applied Behavior Analysis (JABA) is a quarterly peer-reviewed academic journal which publishes empirical research related to applied behavior analysis. It was established in 1968 and is published by Wiley-Blackwell on behalf of the Society for the Experimental Analysis of Behavior. The editor-in-chief is Linda A LeBlanc. 

Common areas of research in JABA include: functional analysis and treatment of severe behavior disorders, classroom instruction in secondary and higher education, early and intensive behavioral interventions for children with autism, voucher-based contingency management in the treatment of substance abuse, and pediatric feeding therapy.

Abstracting and indexing 
The journal is abstracted and indexed in:

According to the Journal Citation Reports, the journal has a 2014 impact factor of 1.088.

See also 
Journal of the Experimental Analysis of Behavior

References

External links 

Behaviorism journals
Delayed open access journals
Publications established in 1968
Quarterly journals
Wiley-Blackwell academic journals
Psychotherapy journals